The UIC Liautaud Graduate School of Business is the graduate business school of the University of Illinois at Chicago. The campus is located just west of downtown Chicago. Degrees granted by the UIC Liautaud Graduate School of Business include the Master of Business Administration (MBA), Master of Science in Accounting (MSA), Master of Science in Business Analytics, Master of Science in Finance, and a Master of Science in Management Information Systems (MSMIS). The UIC Liautaud Graduate School of Business is an entity operating alongside the undergraduate programs within College of Business Administration. In 2003, UIC received a $5 million endowment from Jim Liautaud, his wife Gina, and their son, Jimmy John Liautaud, owner and founder of Jimmy John's, to establish the graduate school in the College of Business Administration. Called The Liautaud Graduate School of Business, it was named in their honor.

History
The UIC MBA was founded in 1977, and the Liautaud Graduate School of Business at UIC was endowed in 2003, named for the Liautaud Family of Chicago. Jim Liautaud, a lifetime member of the University of Illinois Alumni Association, along with his wife Gina, and their son James John Liautaud, founder of the Jimmy John's sandwich franchise, provided a generous gift to the college. The Liautaud family is a long time supporter of the College of Business Administration and the University of Illinois at Chicago. Jim and son Jimmy John were founding members of UIC's Family Business Council and both have been inducted to the UIC Entreprepreneurial Hall of Fame.

Douglas Hall
In fall 2011, students in the UIC Liautaud Graduate School of Business began to take the majority of their classes in the newly renovated Douglas Hall. The university commissioned The Architects Enterprise, Ltd. to design the adaptive reuse of Douglas Hall. Construction began in June 2010. The renovation involved gutting the entire structure and removal or precast concrete and glass, as well as the roof. The building provides an ultra-modern
environment while preserving the original concept of Walter Netsch's Brutalist design, which defined UIC's campus. The building has been certified Gold by LEED.

At a projected cost of $11.7 million, the three-story structure occupies space immediately southeast of University Hall, between Halsted and Morgan streets. The building is flanked by Lincoln Hall and Grant Hall.

Interior Architect Harley Ellis Devereaux fitted the 24,000 sq. ft. glass and reinforced concrete structure with modern accents and muted colors.

Douglas Hall Green Technology
Geothermal Technology

A geothermal well is used as a central heating and/or cooling system that pumps heat to or from the ground.

It uses the earth as a heat source (in the winter) or a heat sink (in the summer). This design takes advantage of the moderate temperatures in the ground to boost efficiency and reduce the operational costs of heating and cooling systems,

The earth connection is a series of pipes buried in the ground between Douglas Hall and University Hall. The pipes carry water, which is the medium for heat between the ground and the building. The heat pump removes the heat from the fluid, concentrates it and transfers it to the building. For cooling, the process is reversed.

The thermal distribution system consists of conventional ductwork to distribute the heated or cooled air from the pump throughout the building.

In addition to geothermal heating and cooling, the old windows were replaced with an insulated glass curtain wall that makes use of daylight. They are covered with temperature-sensitive shades.
Photovoltaic Panels

Photovoltaics is a method of generating electrical power by converting solar radiation into direct current electricity. Photovoltaic power generation employs solar panels composed of a number of solar cells containing a photovoltaic material.

The photovoltaics on the roof of Douglas Hall were partially funded by a grant from the Illinois Clean Energy Community Foundation.
Post-consumer Content

Many of the materials used in the construction of Douglas Hall were made from recycled materials.

The floors on the third floor are made from recycled tires, the terrazzo floor on the first level is made from recycled glass and mirrors. The glass curtain wall that wraps around the building is anchored by aluminum made with scrap metal.
Recycled Rainwater

The paving stones around the building and in the Faith Dremmer Memorial Garden are used to capture rainwater so that it doesn't flow to the sewer. The layers of sediment and crushed stone underneath the paving stones diverts the rainwater to the native plants and flower surrounding the building.

Programs
 Master of Business Administration (MBA)
 Master of Science in Marketing
 Master of Science in Accounting (MSA)
 Master of Science in Business Analytics (MSBA)
 Master of Science in Management Information Systems (MSMIS)
 Master of Science in Finance (MSF)
 PhD in Business Administration
 PhD in Management Information Systems

Rankings

In U.S. News & World Report's 2015 rankings, published in 2014, Liautaud Graduate School of Business was ranked 92nd for best business school.

Liautaud Graduate School of Business continuously appears in The Princeton Review's top 295 business school ranking list.

MBA: Master of Business Administration
The UIC Liautaud Master of Business Administration may be pursued on a part-time or full-time basis. Part-time students register for one or two business courses per semester and complete the program in three to four years; full-time students complete the MBA program in approximately two years.

The UIC Liautaud MBA program is a 13.5 course (54 credit hours) program comprising six core courses (24 credit hours) and 7.5 advanced elective courses (30 credit hours). The core courses are designed to provide students with a basic business foundation.

The Master of Business Administration core curriculum consists of (24 credit hours):
 Financial Accounting
 Microeconomics
 Corporate Finance
 Operations Management
 Marketing
 Organizational Behavior

Following the completion of the core courses, 30 credit hours of advanced elective courses are taken. Using advanced electives, students in the MBA program customize their curriculum to meet their individual career interests and goals by emphasizing one or more of the following concentrations. In order to complete a concentration, students must complete three business courses within the following fields of study:
 Accounting
 Economics
 Entrepreneurship
 Finance
 International Business
 Management
 Management Information Systems
 Marketing
 Real Estate
 Self Directed*

Weekend MBA Program

In 2013, the UIC Liautaud Graduate School of Business introduced a cohort-based, Saturday-only, AACSB-accredited MBA program that can be completed in two calendar years. The cohort program is designed to offer the opportunity for strong team-based collaboration and accelerate the program so that students can complete the required 54-credit hours in two calendar years. Students will take two courses each fall and spring semester, along with a total of three courses over each two-term summer. One summer option includes a two-week travel course in Brazil titled Doing Business in Brazil. Students enrolling in the Weekend MBA will complete all of the core courses required for the degree in the first year of study. In the second year, they will pursue advanced electives and complete a concentration.  The concentrations guaranteed to be available in the Saturday offering are finance and general management.  All of the classes will be offered in the new LEED gold certified Douglas Hall on the UIC campus.

Accelerated One-Year MBA Program

The Accelerated MBA program is a one-year, full-time degree program designed to provide students with 0–4 years of work experience with all of the requirements for an MBA, including professional development and management skills. Once the core courses are complete, students have the opportunity to choose from one of three specialized areas of study to complete their degree:
 Finance 
 Business analytics 
 Marketing

MIS: Master of Science in Management Information Systems

The UIC Liautaud Master of Science in Management Information Systems is an advanced degree in the application of information technology to solve business problems. It is designed to train future CIOs, project managers, and technology leaders in information systems management. Some of the tracks in the program are Business Intelligence Analysis, Health Care and IT, Corporate IT Management, and Business Continuity, Security, and Compliance Risk Planning.

A student in the MIS degree program may specialize in technical, managerial, or a combination of the two areas. MIS courses are organized around three disciplines: (1) Service Operations and Supply Chain Management; (2) Enterprise Information Technology and Technology Project Management; and (3) Business Analytics and Data Mining focused on the finance and marketing sectors. The Liautaud MIS courses stress problem-solving skills with a focus on developing students' abilities to frame, analyze and communicate, assuring a high demand for UIC Liautaud graduates in the job market.

The MIS degree can be obtained on a part-time or full-time basis and most of the courses are offered in the evening. Applicants with an undergraduate degree in MIS from an accredited institution should be able to complete the program in one year of full-time study. Those with degrees in other fields and without MIS and business preparation should be able to complete the degree in two years of full-time study.

MIS degree students must meet both the business and technical background requirements and complete at least 32 semester hours of approved graduate course work. Each prerequisite course may be waived based on equivalent prior coursework or appropriate work experience in the functional area. These courses are prerequisites and will not count towards the minimum degree requirement of 32 hours. Applicants who have not taken all of the prerequisite MIS courses may be admitted on a provisional basis (i.e., with limited rather than full status) and must complete the prerequisites within their first year of enrollment to retain their status in the UIC Liautaud Master of Science program. Accepting limited status is binding on the time to satisfy these requirements.

MSF: Master of Science in Finance

PhD in Management Information Systems

PhD in Business Administration

Areas of Inquiry
 Business Statistics combines an advanced program in statistics and a variety of business applications including accounting, economics, finance, marketing, MIS, operations management and real estate. Students are trained to use state-of-the art computer hardware and software. A second area of support is chosen from departments within the college.
 Human Resource Management emphasizes organizational behavior through an examination of the psychological and sociological determinants of employee behavior in public and private sector organizational settings around the world. Students actively engage in empirical research designed to make theoretical advancements in the understanding of human behavior in organizations.
 Marketing allows for in-depth study of a variety of areas, including consumer behavior, international marketing, entrepreneurship, innovation and product development, and marketing strategy. Students work closely with faculty mentors and develop their own research program to better understand marketplace phenomena and generate new knowledge about marketing processes and buyer and seller behavior.

Joint Degrees
 MBA/Doctor of Medicine (MD)
 MBA/Doctor of Pharmacy (PharmD)
 MBA/Master of Arts (MA) in Economics
 MBA/Master of Public Health (MPH)
 MBA/Master of Science (MS) in Accounting
 MBA/Master of Science (MS) in Management Information Systems
 MBA/Master of Science (MS) in Nursing

References

University of Illinois Chicago
Business schools in Illinois